Qusta ibn Luqa, also known as Costa ben Luca or Constabulus (820912) was a Syrian Melkite Christian physician, philosopher, astronomer, mathematician and translator. He was born in Baalbek. Travelling to parts of the Byzantine Empire, he brought back Greek texts and translated them into Arabic.

Personal life
Qusta ibn Luqa al-Ba'albakki originated from Baalbek (or Heliopolis, now in Lebanon. A Melkite Christian, he was born in 820 and flourished in Baghdad. He was a philosopher, physician, mathematician and astronomer. 
He died in Armenia,  possibly in around 912.

Translations
Qusta ibn Luqa produced, personally revised, or supervised the translations of a number of works. These include works by Diophantos, Theodosius of Bithynia's Sphaerica, On Days and Nights, and On the places of habitation, Autolycus's On the moving sphere and On Risings and Settings, Hypsicles's On Ascensions, works by Aristarchus, Theophrastus’s Meteora, Galen’s catalogue of his books, Hero of Alexandria's Mechanics, and works by John Philoponus.

He wrote commentaries on Euclid and a treatise on the armillary sphere. He was a prominent figure in the Graeco-Arabic translation movement that reached its peak in the 9th century. At the request of wealthy and influential commissioners, Qusta translated works on astronomy, mathematics, mechanics and natural science from Greek into Arabic.

Original works
More than 60 treatises are attributed to Qusta. He wrote mainly on medical subjects, but also on mathematics and astronomy. Only a small number of his works have been published. The extant editions of medical works show that he was thoroughly acquainted with Hippocratic-Galenic humoral medicine—the theoretical system that constituted the basis of formal medicine in Islam.

Qusta's works, many listed in the Fihrist of Ibn al-Nadim, dealt with contemporary science, medicine, astronomy and philosophy. A Latin translation of his work De Differentia Spiritus et Animae was one of the few works not attributed to Aristotle that was included in a list of ‘books to be read by the Masters of the Faculty of Arts, at Paris in 1254, as part of their study of Natural Philosophy. The work was translated by John of Seville (fl. 1140). He wrote a treatise on Nabidh. His Medical Regime for the Pilgrims to Mecca: The Risālā Fī Tadbīr Safar Al-ḥa is available in translation.

Discoveries 
Recent research in 2021 shows that the book 'fargh- beyn-roh va nafs" is the oldest text in which there is a report on pulmonary circulation. For this reason, some consider him the discoverer of pulmonary circulation.

Testimonials

Of him Ibn al-Nadim says: "He is an excellent translator; he knew well Greek, Syriac, and Arabic; he translated texts and corrected many translations. Many are his medical writings." Qusta was with Hunayn Ibn Ishaq the author who best served Greek culture in the Arab civilization.

Involvement with peers

He was also involved, with his fellow-Christian Hunayn ibn Ishaq, in an epistolary exchange with the Muslim astronomer, Abu Isa Yahya ibn al-Munajjim, who had invited them to embrace Islam. Both refused, and provided their reasons for rejecting al-Munajjim's Islamic faith.

Writings
Risalah fī Auja Al Niqris by Qusta Ibn Luqa. Edited with translation and commentary by Hakim Syed Zillur Rahman, Ibn Sina Academy of Medieval Medicine and Sciences, Aligarh, 2007.
Rislah fī al Nabidh (Arabic translation of Qusta ibn Luqa by Rufus. Edited with translation and commentary by Hakim Syed Zillur Rahman, Ibn Sina Academy of Medieval Medicine and Sciences, Aligarh, 2007.
 Rîsâlah-i Nabîdh of  Qustâ bin Lûqâ by Hakim Syed Zillur Rahman, Supplement to 'Studies in the History of Medicine and Science' (SHMS), Jamia Hamdard, Vol. IX(1985), pp. 185–201.
Kitāb fī al‐ʿamal bi‐ʾl–kura al‐nujūmiyya (On the use of the celestial globe; with some variations as to title), which contains 65 chapters and was widely disseminated through at least two Arabic recensions as well as Latin, Hebrew, Spanish, and Italian translations. The Latin translation is edited by R. Lorch - J. Martínez: Qusta ben Lucae De sphera uolubili, in Suhayl, vol. 5 
the extant astronomical work, Hayʾat al‐aflāk (On the configuration of celestial bodies; Bodleian Library MS Arabic 879, Uri, p. 190), which is one of the earliest compositions in theoretical (hayʾa) astronomy
Kitāb al‐Madkhal ilā ʿilm al‐nujūm (Introduction to the science of astronomy – astrology)
Kitāb al‐Madkhal ilā al‐hayʾa wa‐ḥarakāt al‐aflāk wa‐ʾl‐kawākib (Introduction to the configuration and movements of celestial bodies and stars)
Kitāb fī al‐ʿamal bi‐ʾl‐asṭurlāb al‐kurī (On the use of the spherical astrolabe; Leiden University Library MS Or. 51.2: Handlist, p. 12)
Kitāb fī al‐ʿamal bi‐ʾl‐kura dhāt al‐kursī (On the use of the mounted celestial sphere). It is identical to Kitāb fī al‐ʿamal bi‐ʾl-kura al‐nujūmiyya mentioned above.
The Introduction to Geometry. Translation and Commentary by Jan P. Hogendijk in Suhayl, vol. 8

Influence

He was named (as Kusta Ben Luka) by the poet William Butler Yeats as a source for the ideas in the poet's philosophical treatise, A Vision.

See also
 Latin translations of the 12th century
 Toledo School of Translators
 10th century in Lebanon

Notes

References
   (PDF version)
 Les Arabes et les Arméniens à l'époque médiévale
 

820 births
912 deaths
Greek–Arabic translators
Astronomers from the Abbasid Caliphate
Astronomers of the medieval Islamic world
Mathematicians from the Abbasid Caliphate
Physicians from the Abbasid Caliphate
Medieval Syrian physicians
Medieval Syrian astronomers
Medieval Syrian mathematicians
Syrian Melkite Greek Catholics
10th-century physicians
10th-century Syrian people
9th-century Syrian people
Melkites in the Abbasid Caliphate